The Ar-We-Va Community School District is a rural public school district based in Westside, Iowa.  The district is split between Crawford County and Carroll County.  The district serves the towns of Westside, Arcadia, and Vail, and the surrounding rural areas.
  The school's mascot is the Rockets. Their colors are red, black, and white.

Schools
The district operates two schools, both in Westside:
Ar-We-Va Elementary School
Ar-We-Va High School

Ar-We-Va High School

Athletics
The Rockets compete in the Rolling Valley Conference in the following sports:

Baseball
Basketball
Bowling (partners with Carroll Community School District)
Cross Country 
Football
Golf (partners with Carroll Community School District)
Soccer (partners with Carroll Community School District)
Swimming
Softball
Track and Field
Trap Shooting
Volleyball
Wrestling

See also
List of school districts in Iowa
List of high schools in Iowa

References

External links
 Ar-We-Va Community School District

Education in Crawford County, Iowa
Education in Carroll County, Iowa
School districts in Iowa
School districts established in 1956
1956 establishments in Iowa